Cybaeus vignai is a spider species found in France and Italy.

See also 
 List of Cybaeidae species

References

External links 

Cybaeidae
Spiders described in 1977
Spiders of Europe